Bokoro is a town in Chad. The town is served by Bokoro Airport.

Demographics

References

Hadjer-Lamis Region
Populated places in Chad